BMT Group Ltd (previously British Maritime Technology) was established in 1985, from the merger of the UK's British Ship Research Association and National Maritime Institute, as an international multidisciplinary engineering, science and technology consultancy offering services particularly in the defence and security, critical infrastructure, commercial shipping, and environment sectors. The company's heritage goes back to WWII. BMT's head office is in London U.K.
BMT specialises in maritime engineering design, design support, risk and contract management. BMT provides services focused by geography, technology and/or market sector. It employs around 1,500 professionals operating from 47 offices across four continents, with primary bases in South America, Australia, Europe, North America and Asia-Pacific.
In August 2017, Sarah Kenny OBE was appointed as the company's Chief Executive Officer. The company's annual turnover for the year 2019 was approx. £176m.

Organisation 
BMT Group Ltd is a company limited by guarantee with its assets held in trust by the EBT trustees. The remit of the EBT is to ensure the long-term sustainability of the group with the employees as beneficiaries. The EBT trustees are chaired by Wendy Barnes and include other non-executive directors from the board of BMT Group Ltd and a wholly independent external trustee.

History 
Originally formed from the merger and privatisation of the UK’s British Shipbuilders Research Association (BSRA) and the National Maritime Institute (NMI), engineering group BMT enjoyed tax-free status as a scientific research association for more than a decade. BMT's heritage includes the water tanks where the famous 'bouncing bomb' was developed during WWII as well as more recent advances in computer-aided design and aerodynamics.

Notable projects 
BMT gained prominence in 2003 when the Secretary of State for Defence revealed the crucial role of BMT Defence Services in the design of the Future Aircraft Carriers. The company provided much of the design expertise within the Thales CVF Team, whose design was taken forward into the alliance with BAE Systems. Another project is the conversion of the UK MoD's Trials Platform Longbow to perform Sea trials on the PAAMS missile system to be fitted to the UK's Type 45 destroyers. As well as these, BMT is a member of Team 31, the winning team selected to design and build the UK’s new Type 31 frigates for the Royal Navy. Team 31 is a fully integrated project team comprising Babcock, Thales, Odense Maritime Technology and BMT.
They are the world’s leading independent experts in submarine design and development and have contributed to over 70 EU research projects. The US Navy’s high-speed “X-Craft” or “Sea Fighter” Catamaran is a BMT design, as is the Royal Navy’s future aircraft carrier.
Beyond defence, BMT is part of the European Space Agency Development Team, working on earth observation for maritime markets, having been selected in February 2021 by the ESA to assess the feasibility of applying space-based data to support decommissioning of energy assets, including oil and gas platforms and wind farms. BMT has also helped to assess the damage caused by major maritime disasters, from the Piper Alpha platform and the Herald of Free Enterprise in 1987, to the Sea Empress oil spillage and the effects of Hurricane Katrina. The company has also conducted airflow wind-tunnel testing of major landmarks and tall buildings, including Beijing’s Olympic Stadium, Hong Kong’s Stonecutter’s Bridge and Dubai's 21st Century Tower and Burj al-Arab Hotel.

Upgrading HMAS Choules
In early 2011, the Royal Australian Navy (RAN) purchased the Largs Bay from the UK Royal Fleet Auxiliary in order to help support its operations around the world. After extensive sea trials to confirm the condition of the vessel and a major refit to make her suitable for RAN services, she was commissioned as HMAS Choules in December 2011.
As a 16,000-tonne amphibious Landing Ship Dock capable of carrying over 300 troops, 23 Abrams tanks, 150 light trucks, landing craft and capable of operating Navy helicopters, it expanded the RAN fleet’s formidable capability to get landing forces and equipment ashore. However, a number of the warship’s onboard systems were still retained in the UK Royal Fleet Auxiliary configuration, so the Navy undertook a three-year project to carry out the necessary engineering changes that would bring the ship fully into line with Australian Navy requirements.
Taking advantage of BMT's maritime defence and engineering expertise, the vessel’s in-service support contractor, A&P appointed them as in-house design support. This represented the first time that BMT had had such a close and involved relationship with an International Ship Security Certificate and it was a major escalation in their ability to undertake engineering services on an in-service vessel.
BMT's in-house engineering team provided a wide range of essential engineering services and were embedded in the project in order to provide a quick response and easy access to the vessel and relevant Government Furnished Equipment (GFX).

Creating the Nuyina
The Nuyina is Australia's newest icebreaking research and supply vessel (RSV), intended to support Australian bases on Antarctica. Capable of deploying helicopters, landing barges and amphibious trucks to support resupply operations, and with a large moon pool for launching and retrieving sampling equipment and remotely operated vehicles, it provides a platform for marine science research in both sea ice and open water.
Named after the southern lights in the palawa kani language of the Tasmanian Aborigines, it made its first voyage to Antarctica for the 2020-21 summer season, where it acted as the main lifeline for Australia’s Antarctic and sub-Antarctic research stations and the central platform of Australia's Antarctic and Southern Ocean scientific research.
RSV Nuyina represented an important and significant expansion of Australia's Antarctic and Southern Ocean capabilities, with the Australian government investing nearly $2 billion to cover the design, build and 30-year operational and maintenance lifespan of the vessel - the single biggest investment in the history of Australia’s Antarctic Program.
The Prime Contractors for the project engaged BMT to ensure that milestone achievements and capability were delivered on time through design, build and transition into service phases. From key maintenance engineering advice to programmatic and systems engineering requirements, BMT used their embedded resources and local and international capabilities to help overcome the build and transition into service of this large and complex sea platform that presented numerous unique and bespoke requirements.

VIDAR Submarines
VIDAR are proposed designs for small SSK submarines, the proposal includes the larger VIDAR-36 and the smaller VIDAR-7

References

External links 
 
 Article in Financial Director

1985 establishments in the United Kingdom
Companies established in 1985
Defence companies of the United Kingdom
Engineering companies of the United Kingdom
Marine engineering organizations